James Howie  (1804–1884) was a priest of the Church Of Ireland.

Howie was a student at Trinity College, Dublin, graduating B.A. in 1825 and M.A. in 1832; he was ordained deacon in 1826 and priest in 1827. He became curate at St Mary's Church, Mary Street, Dublin.

He was created prebendary of Howth, in St Patrick's Cathedral, Dublin, in 1847; and was the Dean of Cloyne from 1851  until his death, 6 December 1884.

References

Alumni of Trinity College Dublin
Irish Anglicans
Deans of Cloyne
1804 births
1884 deaths